Francois Henri LaLanne (September 26, 1914 – January 23, 2011) was an American fitness and nutrition guru and motivational speaker. He described himself as being a "sugarholic" and a "junk food junkie" until he was aged 15. He also had behavioral problems, but "turned his life around" after listening to a public lecture about the benefits of good nutrition by health food pioneer Paul Bragg. During his career, he came to believe that the country's overall health depended on the health of its population, and referred to physical culture and nutrition as "the salvation of America."

Decades before health and fitness began being promoted by celebrities like Jane Fonda and Richard Simmons, LaLanne was already widely recognized for publicly preaching the health benefits of regular exercise and a good diet. He published numerous books on fitness and hosted the fitness television program The Jack LaLanne Show from 1951 to 1985. As early as 1936, at the age of 21, he opened one of the nation's first fitness gyms in Oakland, California, which became a prototype for dozens of similar gyms bearing his name. One of his 1950s television exercise programs was aimed toward women, whom he also encouraged to join his health clubs. He invented a number of exercise machines, including the pulley and leg extension devices and the Smith machine. Besides producing his own series of videos, he coached the elderly and disabled not to forgo exercise, believing it would enable them to enhance their strength.

LaLanne also gained recognition for his success as a bodybuilder, as well as for his prodigious feats of strength. Arnold Schwarzenegger once exclaimed "That Jack LaLanne's an animal!" after a 54-year-old LaLanne beat then 21-year-old Schwarzenegger in an informal contest. On the occasion of LaLanne's death, Schwarzenegger credited LaLanne for being "an apostle for fitness" by inspiring "billions all over the world to live healthier lives," and, as governor of California, had earlier placed him on his Governor's Council on Physical Fitness. Steve Reeves credited LaLanne as his inspiration to build his muscular physique while keeping a slim waist.

LaLanne was inducted into the California Hall of Fame and has a star on the Hollywood Walk of Fame.

Early life
LaLanne was born in San Francisco, California, the son of Jennie (née Garaig; 1882–1973) and Jean/John LaLanne (1881–1939), French immigrants from Oloron-Sainte-Marie. Both entered the U.S. in the 1880s as young children at the Port of New Orleans. LaLanne had two older brothers, Ervil, who died in childhood (1906–1911), and Norman (1908–2005), who nicknamed him "Jack." He grew up in Bakersfield, California and later moved with his family to Berkeley, California circa 1928. In 1939, his father died at the age of 58 in a San Francisco hospital, which LaLanne attributed to "coronary thrombosis and cirrhosis of the liver." In his book The Jack LaLanne Way to Vibrant Health, LaLanne wrote that as a boy he was addicted to sugar and junk food. He had violent episodes directed against himself and others, describing himself as "a miserable kid ... it was like hell."

Besides having a bad temper, LaLanne also suffered from headaches and bulimia, and temporarily dropped out of high school at the age of 14. The following year, aged 15, he heard health food pioneer Paul Bragg give a talk on health and nutrition, focusing on the "evils of meat and sugar." Bragg's message had a powerful influence on LaLanne, who then changed his life and started focusing on his diet and exercise. In his own words, he was "born again," and besides his new focus on nutrition, he began working out daily (although while serving during World War II as a Pharmacist Mate First Class at the Sun Valley Naval Convalescent Hospital, LaLanne stated that he started in bodybuilding at "age 13"). Describing his change of diet, LaLanne stated, "I had to take my lunch alone to the football field to eat so no one would see me eat my raw veggies, whole bread, raisins and nuts. You don't know the crap I went through."

Writer Hal Reynolds, who interviewed LaLanne in 2008, notes that he became an avid swimmer and trained with weights; he described his introduction to weight lifting thus:

LaLanne went back to school, where he made the high school football team, and later went on to college in San Francisco where he earned a Doctor of Chiropractic degree. He studied Henry Gray's Anatomy of the Human Body and concentrated on bodybuilding and weightlifting.

Fitness career

Health clubs
In 1936, he opened the nation's first health and fitness club in Oakland, California, where he offered supervised weight and exercise training and gave nutritional advice. His primary goal was to encourage and motivate his clients to improve their overall health. Doctors, however, advised their patients to stay away from his health club, a business totally unheard of at the time, and warned their patients that "LaLanne was an exercise 'nut,' whose programs would make them 'muscle-bound' and cause severe medical problems." LaLanne recalls the initial reaction of doctors to his promotion of weight-lifting:

LaLanne designed the first leg extension machines, pulley machines using cables, and the weight selectors that are now standard in the fitness industry. He invented the original model of what became the Smith machine. LaLanne encouraged women to lift weights (though at the time it was thought this would make women look masculine and unattractive). By the 1980s, Jack LaLanne's European Health Spas numbered more than 200. He eventually licensed all his health clubs to the Bally company, now known as Bally Total Fitness.  Though not associated with any gym, LaLanne continued to lift weights until his death.

LaLanne's gym ownership led to a brief professional wrestling career in 1938.  Wrestlers were among the few athletes who embraced weight training, and they frequented his health club. LaLanne wrestled in the Bay Area for only a few months. He was well respected enough that he was booked to wrestle to a draw against some big name opponents rather than lose, despite his lack of experience. According to Ad Santel's grandson David Ad Santel, LaLanne wanted to be a champion from the start, but did not have the wrestling skills to do so. LaLanne was also friendly with such performers as Lou Thesz and Strangler Lewis.

Books, television and other media

LaLanne presented fitness and exercise advice on television for 34 years. The Jack LaLanne Show was the longest-running television exercise program.  According to the SF Chronicle TV program archives, it first began on 28 September 1953 as a 15-minute local morning program (sandwiched between the morning news and a cooking show) on San Francisco's ABC television station, KGO-TV, with LaLanne paying for the airtime himself as a way to promote his gym and related health products.  LaLanne also met his wife Elaine while she was working for the local station.  In 1959, the show was picked up for nationwide syndication, and continued until 1985.

The show was noted for its minimalist set, where LaLanne inspired his viewers to use basic home objects, such as a chair, to perform their exercises along with him. Wearing his standard jumpsuit, he urged his audience "with the enthusiasm of an evangelist," to get off their couch and copy his basic movements, a manner considered the forerunner of today's fitness videos. In 1959, LaLanne recorded Glamour Stretcher Time, a workout album that provided phonograph-based instruction for exercising with an elastic cord called the Glamour Stretcher.  As a daytime show, much of LaLanne's audience were stay-at-home mothers.  Wife Elaine LaLanne was part of the show to demonstrate the exercises, as well as the fact that doing them would not ruin their figures or musculature.  LaLanne also included his dog Happy as a way to attract children to the show.  Later in the run, another dog named Walter was used, with LaLanne claiming "Walter" stood for "We All Love To Exercise Regularly."

LaLanne published several books and videos on fitness and nutrition, appeared in movies, and recorded a song with Connie Haines. He marketed exercise equipment, a range of vitamin supplements, and two models of electric juicers. These include the "Juice Tiger," as seen on Amazing Discoveries with Mike Levey, and "Jack LaLanne's Power Juicer." It was on the show that LaLanne introduced the phrase "That's the power of the juice!" However, in March 1996, 70,000 Juice Tiger juicers, 9% of its models, were recalled after 14 injury incidents were reported. The Power Juicer is still sold in five models.

LaLanne celebrated his 95th birthday with the release of a new book titled, Live Young Forever.
In the book, he discussed how he maintained his health and activeness well into his advanced age.

Personal health routine

Diet
LaLanne blamed overly processed foods for many health problems. For most of his life, Jack was mostly vegetarian while including fish in his evening meal. In his later years, he appeared to advocate a mostly meatless diet that included fish, and took vitamin supplements.

He ate two meals a day and avoided snacks. His breakfast, after working out for two hours, consisted of hard-boiled egg whites, a cup of broth, oatmeal with soy milk, and seasonal fruit. For dinner, he and his wife typically ate raw vegetables, egg whites, and fish. He did not drink coffee.

Exercise
When exercising, LaLanne worked out repetitively with weights until he experienced "muscle fatigue" in whatever muscle groups he was exercising, or when it became impossible for him to go on with a particular routine; this is most often referred to as "training to failure." LaLanne moved from exercise to exercise without stopping. To contradict critics who thought this would leave him tightly musclebound and uncoordinated, LaLanne liked to demonstrate one-handed balancing. His home contained two gyms and a pool that he used daily.

He continued with his two-hour workouts into his 90s, which also included walking.

He stated, "If I died, people would say 'Oh look, Jack LaLanne died. He didn't practice what he preached.'" When asked about sex, LaLanne had a standard joke, saying that despite their advanced age, he and his wife still made love almost every night: "Almost on Monday, almost on Tuesday, almost on Wednesday..."

He added, "I know so many people in their 80s who have Alzheimer's or are in a wheelchair or whatever. And I say to myself 'I don't want to live like that. I don't want to be a burden on my family. I need to live life. And I'd hate dying—it would ruin my image.'"

LaLanne summed up his philosophy about good nutrition and exercise:

Views on food additives and drugs

LaLanne often stressed that artificial food additives, drugs, and processed foods contributed to making people mentally and physically ill. As a result, he writes, many people turn to alcohol and drugs to deal with symptoms of ailments, noting that "a stream of aches and pains seems to encompass us as we get older." He refers to the human bloodstream as a "River of Life," which is "polluted" by "junk foods" loaded with "preservatives, salt, sugar, and artificial flavorings."

Relying on evidence from The President's Council on Physical Fitness, he also agreed that "many of our aches and pains come from lack of physical activity." As an immediate remedy for symptoms such as constipation, insomnia, tiredness, anxiety, shortness of breath, or high blood pressure, LaLanne states that people will resort to various drugs: "We look for crutches such as sleeping pills, pep pills, alcohol, cigarettes, and so on."

Family
LaLanne was married to his second wife, Elaine Doyle LaLanne, for over five decades. They had three children: a daughter named Yvonne LaLanne from his first marriage, a son named Dan Doyle from Elaine's first marriage, and a son named Jon LaLanne together. Yvonne is a chiropractor in California; Dan and Jon are involved in the family business, BeFit Enterprises, which they and their mother and sister plan to continue.  Another daughter from Elaine's first marriage, Janet Doyle, died in a car accident at age 21 in 1974.

Death
LaLanne died of respiratory failure due to pneumonia at his home on January 23, 2011. He was 96. According to his family, he had been sick for a week, but refused to see a doctor. They added that he had been performing his daily workout routine the day before his death. He is buried at Forest Lawn Memorial Park in Hollywood Hills, California.

LaLanne's feats

(As reported on Jack LaLanne's website)  These accounts are not necessarily entirely accurate descriptions of what LaLanne actually did.  See the 1974 Alcatraz Island to Fisherman's Wharf swim (below) for an illustration of the difference between the website account and objective reporting of the same event.
 1955 (age 41)Swam from Alcatraz Island to Pier 43 in San Francisco while handcuffed. When interviewed afterwards, he was quoted as saying that the worst thing about the ordeal was being handcuffed, which significantly reduced his ability to do a jumping jack.
 1956 (age 42)Set what was claimed as a world record of 1,033 push-ups in 23 minutes on You Asked For It,  a television program hosted by Art Baker.
 1957 (age 43)Swam the Golden Gate channel while towing a  cabin cruiser.
 1958 (age 44)Maneuvered a paddleboard nonstop from Farallon Islands to the San Francisco shore. The  trip took 9.5 hours.
 1959 (age 45)Did 1,000 push-ups and 1,000 chin-ups in 1 hour, 22 minutes, to promote The Jack LaLanne Show going nationwide.  LaLanne said this was the most difficult of his stunts, but only because the skin on his hands started ripping off during the chin-ups.  He felt he couldn't stop, because it would be seen as a public failure.
 1974 (age 60)For the second time, he swam from Alcatraz Island to Fisherman's Wharf. Again, he was handcuffed, but this time he was also shackled and towed a  boat, according to his obituary in Los Angeles Times in 2011 and his website. However, according to an account of this event published the day after it occurred in the Los Angeles Times, written by Philip Hager, a Times staff writer, LaLanne was neither handcuffed nor shackled if each of those terms has the conventional meaning of "tightly binding the wrists or ankles together with a pair of metal fasteners." Hager says that LaLanne "had his hands and feet bound with cords that allowed minimal freedom."  But "minimal" clearly did not mean "no" freedom, since elsewhere in the article Hager describes LaLanne's method of propulsion through the water as "half-breast-stroke, half-dog paddle" which is how you swim with your hands tied.
 1975 (age 61)Repeating his performance of 21 years earlier, he again swam the entire length of the Golden Gate Bridge, underwater and handcuffed, but this time he was shackled and towed a  boat.
 1976 (age 62)To commemorate the "Spirit of '76," United States Bicentennial, he swam one mile (1.6 km) in Long Beach Harbor. He was handcuffed and shackled, and he towed 13 boats (representing the 13 original colonies) containing 76 people.
 1979 (age 65)Towed 65 boats in Lake Ashinoko, near Tokyo, Japan.
 1980 (age 66)Towed 10 boats in North Miami, Florida. The boats carried 77 people, and he towed them for over one mile (1.6 km) in less than one hour.
 1984 (age 70)He towed 70 rowboats, one with several guests, from the Queen's Way Bridge in the Long Beach Harbor to the Queen Mary, 1 mile.

Awards and honors

On June 10, 2005, then governor Arnold Schwarzenegger launched  the California Governor's Council on Physical Fitness and Sport. In his address, Schwarzenegger paid special tribute to LaLanne, who he credited with demonstrating the benefits of fitness and a healthy lifestyle for 75 years. In 2008, he inducted LaLanne into the California Hall of Fame and personally gave him an inscribed plaque at a special ceremony.

In 2007, LaLanne was awarded The President's Council's Lifetime Achievement Award. The award is given to "individuals whose careers have greatly contributed to the advancement or promotion of physical activity, fitness, or sports nationwide."  Winners are chosen based on the "individual's career, the estimated number of lives the individual has touched through his or her work, the legacy of the individual's work, and additional awards or honors received over the course of his or her career."

Other honors
 1963: Founding member of President's Council on Physical Fitness under President Kennedy
 President's Council of Physical Fitness Silver Anniversary Award 
 Governor's Council on Physical Fitness Lifetime Achievement Award 
 The Horatio Alger Association of Distinguished Americans 
 American Academy of Achievement 
 American Cancer Society 
 American Heart Association 
 American Medical Association 
 WBBG Pioneer of Fitness Hall of Fame 
 APFC Pioneer of Fitness Hall of Fame 
 Patriarch Society of Chiropractors 
 NFLAHealthy American Fitness Award 
 Received an Award from the Oscar Heidenstam Foundation Hall of Fame 
 Received National Academy of Television Arts & Sciences Gold Circle Award commemorating over 50 years in the Television Industry 
 IHRSA Person of the Year Award 
 Jack Webb Award from the Los Angeles Police Historical Society 
 Interglobal's International Infomercial Award 
 The Freddie, Medical Media Public Service Award 
 Freedom Forum Al Neuharth Free Spirit Honoree 
 Lifetime Achievement Award from Club Industry 
 1992 (age 78): The Academy of Body Building and Fitness Award 
 1994 (age 80): The State of California Governor's Council on Physical Fitness Lifetime Achievement Award 
 1996 (age 82): The Dwight D. Eisenhower Fitness Award 
 1999 (age 85): The Spirit of Muscle Beach Award 
 2002 (age 88): A star on the Hollywood Boulevard Walk of Fame.  At his induction ceremony, LaLanne did pushups on the top of his star.
 2005 (age 91): The Jack Webb Award from the Los Angeles Police Department Historical Society; the Arnold Classic Lifetime Achievement Award; the Interglobal's International Infomercial Award; the Freddie Award; the Medical Media Public Service Award; Free Spirit honoree at Al Neuharth's Freedom Forum; Inaugural Inductee into the National Fitness Hall of Fame
 2008 (age 94): Inducted by California Governor Arnold Schwarzenegger (fellow 2005 inductee of the National Fitness Hall of Fame) and Maria Shriver into the California Hall of Fame

Filmography

LaLanne appeared as himself in the following films and television shows:
 You Bet Your Life (1961)
 Peter Gunn (1960) – LaLanne appeared in an episode with Craig Stevens.
 Mister Ed (1961), episode "Psychoanalyst Show" (as "Instructor"), (1963), episode "Doctor Ed"
 The Addams Family (Season 2, 1966), episode "Fester Goes on a Diet"
 Batman (man on roof with girls, uncredited cameo) (1966)
 Here's Lucy (Season 2, 1969), episode "Lucy and the Bogie Affair"
 Rowan & Martin's Laugh-In (Episode #5.14, 1971), Guest Performer
 Fit & Fun Time (kids TV pilot) (1972)
 The Chevy Chase Show 
 Amazing Discoveries (1991)
 The Simpsons (Season 10, 1999), episode "The Old Man and the 'C' Student"
 Beefcake (1999)
 Hollywood's Magical Island: Catalina (2003)
 "Mostly True Stories: Urban Legends Revealed" (2004)
 Penn & Teller: Bullshit! (Season 2, 2004)
 The Year Without a Santa Claus (2006), Hercules

References

External links

Official
 
Media and publications
 , video, 31 January 2011
 
 LaLanne's book Live Young Forever.
Interviews
 Interview with Jack LaLanne on his 93rd birthday
 Interview with Jack LaLanne
 Interview by Donald Katz
 Interview by Dennis Hughes of Share Guide
 Taped interview with Dr. McDougall 02 July, 1994
 Jack LaLanne interview at Archive of American Television12 September 2003
Miscellaneous
 CPSC Tiger Juicer Recall Page
 Official Jack LaLanne Power Juicer page
 Jack LaLanne Power Juicer manual
 Jack LaLanne interviewed by Janice Hughes and Dennis Hughes
 
Memorials and retrospectives
 Life Magazine remembers Jack LaLanneslideshow
 Chicago Tribune photo gallery of Jack LaLanne |1914-2011

1914 births
2011 deaths
American bodybuilders
American chiropractors
American exercise and fitness writers
American exercise instructors
American health and wellness writers
American nutritionists
American people of French descent
Berkeley High School (Berkeley, California) alumni
Burials at Forest Lawn Memorial Park (Hollywood Hills)
Deaths from pneumonia in California
Deaths from respiratory failure
Diet food advocates
People associated with physical culture
People from Morro Bay, California
Television personalities from San Francisco
Writers from San Francisco